Berocca is a brand of effervescent drink and vitamin tablets containing B vitamins and vitamin C, manufactured by Bayer. Berocca was originally established in Switzerland in 1969 by Roche, and is available in a number of countries worldwide.

Varieties 
Berocca Performance is a formulation of B vitamins, vitamin C plus added magnesium, calcium and zinc. When first released in 1969, Berocca came in one flavour, Berry, which later became Original Berry. It now comes in four flavours: Original Berry, Orange, Blackcurrant, and Mango & Orange.

Dosage and considerations
The recommended daily dose (age 12 upwards) is one tablet daily. Each tablet contains 260 mg of sodium. 273 mg of sodium is contained in the tablets sold in Australia and New Zealand.

Berocca causes urine to turn deep yellow in colour – this is due to the excess vitamin B2 (also known as Riboflavin, with "flavus" meaning "yellow" in Latin) being passed via urine.

Berocca's effervescent tablets contain small quantities of aspartame (phenylalanine).

Marketing
Berocca ran a series of television commercials in Australia and New Zealand throughout the 1980s and 1990s, using the slogan "B-B-B-Berocca gives you back your B-B-Bounce".

A recent marketing campaign in Australia for Berocca Performance with the slogan "Release the inner geek" targets high school students studying for exams.

In South Africa a "Beready Besharp Berocca" campaign was launched.

Long-running Outdoor (poster) campaigns in the United Kingdom with the slogan "Stay sharp".

In 2008 a television advert was launched featuring people dancing using treadmills similar to OK Go's music video for the 2006 song "Here It Goes Again". The music is "Living on the Ceiling" by the British synthpop band Blancmange, taken from their 1982 album Happy Families.

In September 2010, a new advertising campaign featuring lumberjacks dancing on water has been launched, with the slogan "You, but on a really good day."

In March 2011 the Health Department of Australia moved to withdraw the advertising of Berocca for its unsubstantiated claims of providing invigoration.  The same department had given Berocca a Healthcare product award in November 2010.

In June 2014, a 30-second television ad entitled "Mind and Body," featuring Joel McHale and Kali "Muscle" Kirkendall, and backed by the song "Sirius" from the 1982 album "Eye in the Sky" by The Alan Parsons Project, first appeared on US national television and cable networks.

In October 2020, a Vietnamese ad campaign encouraged consumers to "Get Supercharged at 2 PM" by using Berocca in the early afternoon. This campaign saw a boost in online sales by 233 percent.

See also
Emergen-C

References

External links
 – official site

Dietary supplements
Bayer brands